DeucesCracked was a poker instruction website business and an internet forum for the discussion of poker strategy. DeucesCracked offers a fee-based service that provides access to their catalogue of poker instructional videos.

History
Prior to founding DeucesCracked, Jay Rosenkrantz established a personal coaching company 3bet.net. Jay, alongside industry competitor and CardRunners professional Taylor Caby, featured in a Forbes Video Network documentary that explored the world of online poker-coaching as an emerging business in 2007.

The DeucesCracked brand was founded in January 2007 with Rob Cole, Joe Tall, Chris Vitch, Chuck Danielsson, and Jay Rosenkrantz as the executive officers.

Training videos were produced in 8-part series, and each series was part of a video season. Video series cover a variety of poker games, including, Texas hold 'em, Pot Limit Omaha, 2-7 Triple Draw, Seven-card stud, Stud 8-or-Better and Razz. It has also produced material covering H.O.R.S.E., 8-game and 7-game mix.

On 9 July 2009, DeucesCracked hosted a fund-raising Connect Four competition and auction, raising money for the Lili Claire Foundation. The event was hosted at Planet Hollywood in Paradise, Nevada and raised over $20,000.

In January 2010, DeucesCracked presented the Aussie Millions Academy. The series of live seminars covered several game variants and followed the Aussie Millions tournament schedule.

In August 2015, DeucesCracked.com was acquired by iGaming affiliate FourCubed LLC. FourCubed have since sold the site.

Video producers 
Jay Rosenkrantz is a minor celebrity from the G4TV series 2 Months 2 Million. In November 2009, Jay's co-star and poker professional Dani Stern joined Deucescracked as an executive producer after leaving a rival training site, PokerSavvyPlus.

Vanessa Selbst, a WSOP bracelet holder, was formerly an executive producer for the site. Other bracelet winning content producers include John Beauprez and Vincent Van Der Fluit

Video Content 
In 2010 the users of DeucesCracked nominated the video series Eightfold Path to Poker Enlightenment with Tommy Angelo and Wayne Lively as the Best Overall Series.

In 2009, DeucesCracked produced the podcast DeucePlays which was hosted by Bart Hanson. The show included strategy discussion and an interview with a prominent member of the poker community; several members of the site have featured as guests, as have other notable players including Tommy Angelo, Matt Flynn, Terrence Chan, Andrew Robl, Justin Smith, Dan Harrington, Cole South, Phil Galfond, David Peat and Bobby Hoff. Until December 2008, Bart hosted PokerRoad Radio at PokerRoad.com, but was replaced by Ali Nejad. After completing its run, DeucePlays was replaced by the Live Poker Edge and Small Stakes Edge podcasts.

References

External links 
 Official site

Defunct poker companies